Dino Spadetto (born January 25, 1950 in Caerano di San Marco) is a retired Italian professional football player.

1950 births
Living people
Italian footballers
Serie A players
Inter Milan players
S.S.C. Bari players
U.C. Sampdoria players
Parma Calcio 1913 players
Venezia F.C. players
Calcio Montebelluna players
Association football forwards